Vicente de Peraza (died 1553) was a Roman Catholic prelate who served as the second Bishop of Panamá (1520–1526).

Biography
Vicente de Peraza was ordained a priest in the Order of Preachers. On December 5, 1520, Pope Leo X appointed him as the second Bishop of Panamá. On April 1, 1521, he was consecrated bishop by Francisco Bobadilla, Bishop of Salamanca with Paride de Grassis, Bishop of Pesaro as Co-Consecrator. In 1526, he resigned as Bishop of Panamá. He died in 1553.

References

External links and additional sources
 (for Chronology of Bishops) 
 (for Chronology of Bishops) 

1553 deaths
Bishops appointed by Pope Leo X
Dominican bishops
16th-century Roman Catholic bishops in Panama
Roman Catholic bishops of Panamá